Miankuh Rural District is in the Central District of Mehriz County, Yazd province, Iran. At the National Census of 2006, its population was 1,518 in 641 households. There were 1,131 inhabitants in 505 households at the following census of 2011. At the most recent census of 2016, the population of the rural district was 1,210 in 565 households. The largest of its 46 villages was Manshad, with 345 people.

References 

Mehriz County

Rural Districts of Yazd Province

Populated places in Yazd Province

Populated places in Mehriz County